Persoonia cymbifolia is a species of flowering plant in the family Proteaceae and is endemic to the south of Western Australia. It is an erect, spreading shrub with smooth bark, hairy young branchlets, linear to narrow oblong leaves and yellow flowers borne singly or in groups of up to three on a short rachis.

Description
Flowering occurs from December to January.

Taxonomy
Persoonia cymbifolia was first formally described in 1994 by Peter Weston in the journal Telopea from specimens collected by William R. Archer near Mount Ridley north-east of Esperance in 1991.

Distribution and habitat
This geebung grows in heath from the Frank Hann National Park to the Cape Arid National Park in the Coolgardie, Esperance Plains and Mallee biogeographic regions.

Conservation status
Persoonia cymbifolia is classified as "Priority Three" by the Government of Western Australia Department of Parks and Wildlife meaning that it is poorly known and known from only a few locations but is not under imminent threat.

References

cymbifolia
Flora of Western Australia
Plants described in 1994
Taxa named by Peter H. Weston